Mundleville is a community in Weldford located at the confluence of the Richibucto River and the St. Nicholas River.  Today the community features some of the most beautiful homes along the Richibucto River, has a few small businesses and hosts an Annual Winter Carnival.  Mundleville is located mainly around the Intersection of  Route 510 and Route 470.

History

Mundleville had a Post Office 1899-1956. In 1904 Mundleville was a farming settlement with 1 post office, 1 store, 1 church and a population of 125.

Notable people

See also
List of communities in New Brunswick

References
 

Settlements in New Brunswick
Communities in Kent County, New Brunswick